The following is a list of all IFT-licensed over-the-air television stations broadcasting in the Mexican state of Guanajuato.

List of television stations

|-

|-

|-

|-

|-

|-

|-

|-

|-

|-

|-

|-

|-

|-

|-

|-

|-

|-

|-

|-

|-

|-

|-

|-

|-

|-

|-

|-

|-

|-

|-

|-

|-

|-

|-

|-

|-

Defunct stations
 XHGSM-TDT RF 23, virtual 8 (formerly analog 4) (2000–2021)

Notes

References

Television stations in Guanajuato
Guan